The 1989 Metro Conference men's basketball tournament was held March 9–11 at the Carolina Coliseum in Columbia, South Carolina. 

Louisville defeated Florida State in the championship game, 87–80, to win their seventh Metro men's basketball tournament.

The Cardinals received the conference's automatic bid to the 1989 NCAA Tournament. In addition, Florida State, Memphis State, and South Carolina received at-large bids.

Format
Five of the conference's seven members participated, with Cincinnati and Virginia Tech left out. Teams were seeded based on regular season conference records, with the top three teams (Florida State, Louisville, Memphis State) earning a bye into the semifinal round. The other two teams – South Carolina and Southern Miss – entered into the quarterfinal round.

Bracket

References

Metro Conference men's basketball tournament
Tournament
Metro Conference men's basketball tournament
Metro Conference men's basketball tournament